Manjir may refer to:
 Manjir, Khuzestan
 Manjir, Mazandaran

See also
 Azad Manjir